Molecular Brain Research was a peer-reviewed scientific journal of molecular neuroscience. It was established in 1989 and was merged with Brain Research in 2006.

External links
 Molecular Brain Research online archive
 List of Molecular Brain Research issues at IngentaConnect
 Brain Research 

Neuroscience journals
Publications established in 1989
Publications disestablished in 2005
Elsevier academic journals
English-language journals